Kennedy Russell (15 September 1883 – 1 March 1954) was a British composer of film scores. He was employed by British National Films during the Second World War, and died aged 70 in 1954.

Filmography

 Jimmy Boy (1935)
 Birds of a Feather (1936)
 Sunshine Ahead (1936)
 Men of Yesterday (1936)
 Hearts of Humanity (1936)
 The Song of the Road (1937)
 Talking Feet (1937)
 Riding High (1937)
 The Academy Decides (1937)
 Stepping Toes (1938)
 Secret Journey (1939)
 What Would You Do, Chums? (1939)
 Laugh It Off (1940)
 Old Mother Riley in Society (1940)
 Old Mother Riley in Business (1941)
 Crook's Tour (1941)
 Old Mother Riley's Ghosts (1941)
 Old Mother Riley's Circus (1941)
 The Common Touch (1941)
 Those Kids from Town (1942)
 Let the People Sing (1942)
 Salute John Citizen (1942)
 Asking for Trouble (1942)
 We'll Smile Again (1942)
 When We Are Married (1943)
 Old Mother Riley Detective (1943)
 Theatre Royal (1943)
 The Dummy Talks (1943)
 The Shipbuilders (1943)
 Dreaming (1944)
 Give Me the Stars (1945)
 Here Comes the Sun (1946)
 The Grand Escapade (1947)
 Nothing Venture (1948)
 The Dragon of Pendragon Castle (1950)
 The Second Mate (1950)
 Judgment Deferred (1952)

References

Bibliography
 Brian McFarlane. Lance Comfort. Manchester University Press, 1999.

External links

Place of birth unknown
20th-century British composers
1883 births
1954 deaths
British film score composers
British male composers
20th-century British male musicians